Apaven is a village in the Lori Province of Armenia by the Armenia–Georgia border. The village was populated by Azerbaijanis before the exodus of Azerbaijanis from Armenia after the outbreak of the Nagorno-Karabakh conflict.

References

External links 

Populated places in Lori Province